Bhoomi (ভূমি)(literally means earth) is a Bengali urban folk music group based in Kolkata, West Bengal, India.  Formed in 1999, it soon become hugely popular and performed  in various local, national and international platforms. In July 2006 they performed at the United Nations headquarters in New York City. Bhoomi has also performed at the Montreal Jazz Festival in 2008.

Style
This is the only band which defines its music as ‘urban folk'.  The band uses a fusion of modern, urban lyrics with rural Bengali folk tunes like baul, which was a very early style of music by wandering minstrels in rural Bengal or Bhatiyali (traditionally sung by the boatmen on the Ganges and also the Padma in Bangladesh). They have also re-done old folk songs which were unknown to the modern day urban Bengali and revived such gems with an infusion of fresh music and a lively spirit and pep to the old songs.

The band's efforts have been to expand their brand of urban music beyond the college campus and youth circuit to the older listeners. One of their main inspirations behind their music is everyday city life, which they experience and which is experienced by so many people everywhere. One of Bhoomi's first released songs 'Barandaye Roddur' went on to become a mainstream hit and is still immensely popular today.

Their popularity is rooted in a unique sound that combines a variety of traditional folk tunes with an array of western rhythms with western instrumentation and mixed harmoniously with Bengal's folk instruments like the Khamak, Ektara, Khonjoni, etc.

Members
Their current line-up includes 4 band members -

 Soumitra Ray          - Songwriter, Composer, Lead vocals, Drums, Congas, Bongos and Percussion
 Hemanto Goswami       - Acoustic,  Electric Guitar and backing vocalist
 Abhijit Ghosh         - Bass Guitar and backing vocals
 Robin Lai             - Keyboards, Violin, Harmonium and also the sound engineer of the band
 Arjyesh Ray           - drums

Former Member
 Surojit Chatterjee    - Songwriter, Composer, Lead vocals, Guitar, Tabla
 Chandrani Banerjee    - Vocals
Vikramjit Banerjee  - Acoustic and Electric Guitars

Albums
 Jatra Shuru (2000) - Times Music
 Udaan (2001) - Times Music
 Isspecial (2002) - Times Music
 Paal Chhuteche (2003) - Saregama
 Lokgeeti Local (2004) - Times Music
 Dekhtey Dekhtey (2004) - Saregama
 Bojhaai Kora Gaaner Gaari (2005) - Saregama
 Gaan Bahan (2007) - Times Music
 Lokegeetir Deshe (2008) - Times Music
 Aamra Nuton Joubaneri Doot (Rabindrasangeet) (2009) - Times Music
 Gaan Doriyay (2010) - Universal Music India
 Doshe Pa (2010) - Times Music
 Desh Jurrey (2011) - Universal Music India
 Ekir Mikir (2016) - Universal Music India
 Prem Pagol (2018) - Hindusthan Records (INRECO)

References

Bengali music
Indian musical groups
Bengali musicians
Musical groups established in 1999
1999 establishments in West Bengal